The Norway national football team (or informally Landslaget) represents Norway in men's international football and is controlled by the Norwegian Football Federation, the governing body for football in Norway. Norway's home ground is Ullevaal Stadion in Oslo and their head coach is Ståle Solbakken. Norway has participated three times in the FIFA World Cup (1938, 1994, 1998), and once in the UEFA European Championship (2000).

Norway is the only national team that remains unbeaten in all matches against Brazil. In four matches, Norway has a play record against Brazil of 2 wins and 2 draws, in three friendly matches (in 1988, 1997 and 2006) and a 1998 World Cup group stage match.

History

Norway's performances in international football have usually been weaker than those of their Scandinavian neighbours Sweden and Denmark, but they did have a golden age in the late 1930s. An Olympic team achieved third place in the 1936 Olympics, after beating the host Germany earlier in the tournament. Norway also qualified for the 1938 FIFA World Cup, where they lost 2–1 after extra time against eventual champions Italy. This was Norway's last World Cup finals appearance in 56 years.

In the post-war years, up to and including the 1980s, Norway was usually considered one of the weaker teams in Europe. They never qualified for a World Cup or European Championship in this period, and usually finished near the bottom of their qualifying group. Nevertheless, Norway had a reputation for producing the occasional shock result, such as the 3–0 win against Yugoslavia in 1965, the 1–0 away win against France in 1968, and the 2–1 victory against England in 1981 that prompted radio commentator Bjørge Lillelien's famous "Your boys took a hell of a beating" rant.

Norway had their most successful period from 1990 to 1998 under the legendary coach Egil "Drillo" Olsen. At its height in the mid-90s the team was ranked No. 2. Olsen started his training career with Norway with a 6–1 home victory against Cameroon on 31 October 1990 and ended it on 27 June 1998 after a 0–1 defeat against Italy in the second stage of the 1998 World Cup.

In qualifying for the 1994 World Cup, Norway topped their group, finishing above both the European Championship winning and three-time World Cup finalists the Netherlands, and also above former World Cup winners England, beating both teams in the process.

In the 1994 World Cup in the United States, Norway was knocked out at the group stage after a win against Mexico, a defeat against Italy and a draw against the Republic of Ireland. Norway failed to qualify for second round qualification on goals scored as all 4 teams in the group finished with 4 points and identical goal difference. In the 1998 World Cup in France, Norway was once again eliminated by Italy in the first round of the knock out stage after finishing second in their group, having drawn against Morocco and Scotland and won 2–1 against Brazil.

Former under-21 coach Nils Johan Semb replaced Olsen after the planned retirement of the latter. Under Semb's guidance, Norway qualified for Euro 2000, which remains their last finals appearance to date. Semb resigned at the end of an unsuccessful qualifying campaign in 2003, and was replaced by Åge Hareide. Under Hareide, Norway came close to reaching both the 2006 World Cup and Euro 2008, but ultimately fell short on both occasions. Then, in 2008, it all fell apart as Norway failed to win a single game the entire calendar year. Hareide resigned at the end of 2008. His replacement, initially on a temporary basis, was the returning Egil Olsen, who began his second spell in charge with an away win against Germany, and subsequently signed a three-year contract. Olsen resigned in September 2013 after Norway lost at home to Switzerland and had limited chances to qualify for the 2014 World Cup with one game to spare. He was replaced with Per-Mathias Høgmo. Olsen later claimed he was sacked.

Team image

Crest

Norway used the national flag on a white circle as their badge from the 1920s onwards. In May 2008 the NFF unveiled a new crest, a Viking-style Dragon wrapped around the NFF logo. After massive public pressure the crest was dropped. Between the 1980s and the 1990s, Norway used the NFF logo in the opposite breast of the shirt together with the national flag on a white circle. On 12 December 2014, a new crest was presented. The crest primarily features the national flag, in addition, there are two lions taken from the Coat of arms of Norway on the top. The lions are facing each other while holding a blue miniature of the NFF logo, and between the lions and above the NFF logo, it says "NORGE" (Norway) in blue letters.

Kit suppliers 
Between 1996 and 2014, Norway's kits were supplied by Umbro. They took over from Adidas who supplied Norway's kit between 1992 and 1996.

On 10 September 2014, the NFF and Nike announced a new partnership that made the sportswear provider the official Norwegian team kit supplier from 1 January 2015. The new partnership will run until at least 2021.

Results and fixtures

2022

2023

Managers
The following is a list of all managers of the national team. Prior to 1953, the team was selected by a selection committee, which also continued to select the team until 1969.

Players

Current squad

The following players were called up for the UEFA Euro 2024 qualifying games against Spain and Georgia on 25 and 28 March 2023, respectively.

Caps and goals correct as of 20 November 2022, after the match against Finland.

 

Recent call-ups
The following players have been called up for the Norway squad within the last 12 months.

INJ Withdrew due to injury
PRE Preliminary squad / standby
RET Retired from the national team
SUS Serving suspension
QUA Placed in mandatory quarantine 
WD Withdrew due to non-injury issue. 
EX Player expelled from the squad due to non-injury issue.

Player recordsPlayers in bold are still active with Norway.''

Top appearances

Top goalscorers

Competitive record

FIFA World Cup

UEFA European Championship

UEFA Nations League

Olympic Games

All-time team record
The following table shows Norway's all-time international record, correct as of 27 September 2022.

Honours

Official

Olympic Games
  Bronze medal: 1936

See also

Football in Norway
Norway women's national football team
Norway national under-21 football team
Norway national under-20 football team
Norway national under-19 football team
Norway national under-17 football team
Sápmi football team

Notes

References

External links

Official website of The Norwegian Football Association (NFF)
Norway FIFA profile
Norway UEFA profile
RSSSF archive of results 1908–
RSSSF archive of most capped players and highest goalscorers
Complete list of Norwegian international players

 
European national association football teams
 
1908 establishments in Norway
Association football clubs established in 1908